Léon Labbé (September 29, 1832 – March 21, 1916) was a French surgeon and politician who was born in the village of Le Merlerault in the department of Orne. He was an uncle to physician Charles Labbé (1851–1889), who first described the inferior anastomotic vein (vein of Labbé).

From 1856 to 1860 Labbé was a hospital intern in Paris, and in 1861 earned his medical doctorate. Afterwards, he was a surgeon at several hospitals in Paris, including the Hôpital Beaujon, where he was chief-surgeon for many years. In 1879 he became a member of the Académie de Médecine.

In 1892 he was elected to the Senate representing the department of Orne. In this role, he introduced various laws of interest to the medical community, including the 1914 Loi Labbé (Labbé Law), legislation that provided compulsory anti-typhoid vaccinations for French soldiers.

Associated eponym 
 Labbé triangle: Location where the stomach is normally in contact with the abdominal wall.

References 
 
 Mondofacto Dictionary definition of eponym

French surgeons
1832 births
1916 deaths
Politicians of the French Third Republic
People from Orne
Senators of Orne